Kelowna is a city on Okanagan Lake in the Okanagan Valley in the southern interior of British Columbia, Canada. It serves as the head office of the Regional District of Central Okanagan. The name Kelowna derives from the Okanagan word kiʔláwnaʔ, referring to a male grizzly bear.

Kelowna is the province's third-largest metropolitan area (after Vancouver and Victoria), while it is the seventh-largest city overall and the largest in the Interior. It is the 20th-largest metropolitan area in Canada. The city proper encompasses , and the census metropolitan area . Kelowna's estimated population in 2020 is 222,748 in the metropolitan area and 142,146 in the city proper. After many years of suburban expansion into the surrounding mountain slopes, the city council adopted a long-term plan intended to increase density instead - particularly in the downtown core. This has resulted in the construction of taller buildings, including One Water Street - a 36-storey building that is the tallest in Kelowna. Other highrise developments have already broken ground or been approved since then, including a 42-storey tower on Leon Avenue which will be the tallest building in the city, and among the tallest in B.C.

Nearby communities include the City of West Kelowna (also referred to as Westbank and Westside) to the west, across Okanagan Lake; Lake Country and Vernon to the north; Peachland to the southwest; and Summerland and Penticton to the south.

History 
The exact dates of first settlement in the Okanagan Valley are unknown, but a northern migration led to the habitation of this area some 9,000 years ago. The Indigenous Syilx people are the first known inhabitants of the region, where they continue to live today.

In 1811, David Stuart travelled to the Okanagan Valley, becoming the first European to do so. Despite this, it was not until 1859 that Father Pandosy, a French Roman Catholic Oblate missionary, became the first European to settle there. Pandosy's settlement was located at l'Anse au Sable (Bay of Sand), which he named in reference to the sandy shoreline. Although the population remained small for the rest of the 19th century, sustenance fruit growing expanded in Kelowna during the 1870s, and by the 1890s, commercial agriculture had become firmly established.

Kelowna was officially incorporated on May 4, 1905, with a population of 600. The town's first mayor was Henry Raymer.

Although agriculture had become an important mark of Kelowna on the surrounding region, the town was entirely reliant on transportation over Okanagan Lake until 1925. In 1893 the Canadian Pacific Railway constructed the steamer SS Aberdeen on the lake, which served as the first significant transportation link between Kelowna and Penticton, greatly increasing the speed of Kelowna's growth. On September 11, 1925, the Canadian Pacific Railway was finally extended to Kelowna, ending the town's reliance on Okanagan Lake for transportation and trade.

In 1911, Chinese revolutionary Sun Yat-sen visited Kelowna for fundraising. At that time, around 15% of the population was ethnically Chinese.

On August 6, 1969, a sonic boom from a nearby air show broke a quarter million dollars worth of glass, injuring six people. The destruction was caused by a member of the United States' Blue Angels during a practice routine for the Kelowna Regatta festival when the pilot accidentally broke the sound barrier while flying too low.

On November 25, 2005, the First Ministers and National Aboriginal Leaders signed the Kelowna Accord, which sought to improve the lives of Indigenous peoples.

Kelowna celebrated its centennial in May 2005. The same year, construction began on the new five-lane William R. Bennett Bridge to replace the three-lane Okanagan Lake Bridge, as part of a plan to alleviate traffic problems during summer tourist season. The new bridge was completed in 2008.

On July 12, 2021, a crane suffered a catastrophic failure while being dismantled at a construction site located at St. Paul Street near Bernard Avenue in downtown Kelowna. Part of the crane struck a nearby office building and seniors home. The city declared a local state of emergency and area residents were evacuated. Five people were killed in the collapse: four construction workers and one person in the office building.

Wildfires 

In Kelowna many seasonal wildfires have occurred over the years. Some significant fires warranting evacuations and/or causing damage are listed below:
 In August 2003, a nearby wildfire destroyed 239 homes and forced the temporary evacuation of about 30,000 residents. Many trestles of the historic Kettle Valley Railway were destroyed. The trestles have been rebuilt to look like the originals, but using smaller dimension beams. This fire consumed 25,000 hectares of land.
 In July 2009, wildfires destroyed hundreds of hectares of forest and a number of buildings in West Kelowna; 17,000 residents were evacuated.
In July 2009, a 100-ha fire near Rose Valley caused the evacuation of 7,000 people. No structures were lost.
In July 2009, a 9,200-ha fire behind Fintry caused the evacuation of 2,500 people. No structures were lost.
In September 2012, a late-season, 200-ha fire destroyed seven buildings and caused the evacuation of 1,500 people in the community of Peachland.
In July 2014, a 340-ha fire behind the West Kelowna subdivision of Smith Creek caused the evacuation of 3,000 people.
In July 2015, a 560-ha fire near Shelter Cove caused the evacuation of 70 properties.
In August 2015, a 130-ha fire burned near Little White Mountain, just south of Kelowna.
In August 2017, a 400-ha fire in the Joe Rich area caused the evacuation of over 474 properties.

Geography

Landmarks

Vegetation 

Kelowna's official flower is Balsamorhiza sagittata, commonly referred to as arrowleaf balsamroot.

Climate 

Kelowna is classified as a humid continental climate or an inland oceanic climate per the Köppen climate classification system due to its coldest month having an average temperature slightly above  and below , with dry, hot, sunny summers and cool, cloudy winters, and four seasons. The official climate station for Kelowna is at the Kelowna International Airport, which is at a higher elevation than the city core, with slightly higher precipitation and cooler nighttime temperatures. Kelowna has the second mildest winter of any non-coastal city in Canada, after neighbouring Penticton. This is caused by the moderating effects of Okanagan Lake combined with mountains separating most of BC from the prairies; however Arctic air masses do occasionally penetrate the valley during winter, usually for very short periods. The coldest recorded temperature in the city was  recorded on 30 December 1968.

Weather conditions during December and January are one of the cloudiest in Canada outside of Newfoundland due to persistent valley cloud. As Okanagan Lake hardly ever freezes, warmer air rising from the lake climbs above colder atmospheric air, creating a temperature inversion which can cause the valley to be socked in by cloud. The last time the lake completely froze over was in the winter of 1969. It may have frozen over in the winter of 1986. This valley cloud has a low ceiling, however, and often bright sunshine can be experienced by driving only 20 minutes or so up into the nearby mountains, above the cloud. Summers in Kelowna are very warm (sometimes hot) and sunny, with daytime temperatures often exceeding . Not unusually, heat waves occur in July, August, and even June and September on occasion, where temperatures above  persist for weeks. Temperatures usually reach the high 30's °C or above for at least a few days each summer. During summer, clear, dry air allows night-time temperatures to fall rapidly, however nights are somewhat warm by Canadian standards.

While some smaller communities such as Blue River and Golden get less wind, Kelowna has the greatest percentage of "calm" wind observations for any major city in Canada (39% of the time). As shown in the climate chart below, Kelowna has an average high temperature that is above freezing every month of the year - an exceptionally rare phenomenon for an inland Canadian city. In fact, average high temperatures in January surpass those of the most southern areas in Canada, such as Windsor, Ontario.

Sectors and neighbourhoods 

Kelowna consists of ten sectors with multiple neighbourhoods within the sector boundaries.

Neighbourhoods

Central City 
Central City is a linear commercial sector along Harvey Avenue, from downtown to Highway 33. Major commercial developments include the Capri Centre mall, the Landmark buildings, and the Orchard Park Shopping Centre. Commercial activity is particularly concentrated along or near Highway 97 (Harvey).

Dilworth Mountain
Dilworth Mountain is a relatively low, isolated mountain of just over 2000 feet, near the city's geographic center. Adjoining Knox Mountain to the west, it is part of the eastern heights that form Glenmore Valley, and rises about one thousand feet above the rest of the Okanagan Valley. It has been extensively developed in recent years with scenic neighbourhoods with suburban character that are only minutes from Central City. Like many other Kelowna residential districts, Dilworth has gone from relative isolation and wilderness to hosting hundreds of homes, many of which are considered fairly high-end.

Downtown 

Central Kelowna is a tourist district alongside Okanagan Lake. It is officially defined as all land north of Highway 97, south of Clement Avenue, east of Okanagan Lake, and west of Richter Street. There are two main routes through the downtown core along which attractions and commerce are concentrated, including several parks and beaches, boardwalks and other walking trails, Kelowna Marina and Yacht Club, the Delta Grand Hotel and Casino, and Prospera Place arena. The other main route through downtown is Bernard Avenue from Richter street to the lake, with more shops and restaurants designed for both locals and tourists. Although Bernard Avenue continues east well past downtown, it is not part of downtown and is zoned residential. The commercial segment lies within its downtown section between Richter and Abbott streets, the latter of which is lake-adjacent.

Kelowna has declared a  downtown area a "red zone" of prolific drug trafficking, assaults and robberies. The red zone extends from Okanagan Lake to the west, Lake Avenue, Rowcliffe to Ethel and Ethel to Stockwell, Doyle and back to the lake. The red zone was identified in 1992 to reduce street crime. The RCMP conducts annual "spring sweeps" there, arresting low-level drug dealers. Kelowna was the second British Columbia city to declare a red zone.

Glenmore 
Glenmore is a relatively affluent suburb mostly within Glenmore Valley, a subsection of the Okanagan Valley in the Kelowna area. It has been extensively developed in the past two decades, transformed from a small suburb with a rural character to large suburban neighbourhoods, including several elementary schools and a rapidly growing commercial hub. While most of its homes are on the relatively flat valley bottom, several large and more recent neighbourhoods are being built into the adjacent mountains, including the community of Wilden.

Midtown 
The Midtown area, bordered by Enterprise Way on the north and Springfield and Baron Road at the south, is a popular shopping destination for locals. Orchard Park, the shopping complex in BC's interior, is here. Since most of Midtown consists of large, car-oriented big-box stores, it is often criticized for its plainness; its contributions to urban sprawl and the decline of the pedestrian-oriented Downtown; and its lack of green space, as the area was formerly a linear park and golf course.

Mission 
Known locally as "the Mission" (or "Okanagan Mission") to differentiate it from the Lower Mainland city of Mission, this area was a separate jurisdiction before being amalgamated with Kelowna in the mid- to late-20th century. It features a vibrant secondary commercial centre separate from that of Downtown, with low- to moderate-density residential areas between them. Its northern border is K.L.O. Road. It is often differentiated as Lower Mission and Upper Mission.

The Lower Mission contains most of the aforementioned commercial areas such as shopping malls, grocery stores, coffee shops, and boutiques. Lower Mission also has extensive recreational facilities, Mission Recreation Park has 6 softball diamonds as well as soccer fields, community gardens, playgrounds and trails, while neighbouring H2O is Kelowna's largest indoor recreation facility with a 50 m pool, water slides, diving boards and surfing wave. Gyro Beach and Rotary Beach, two of Kelowna's most popular beaches, are also located in the Lower Mission.

The Upper Mission begins to extend into the foothills and higher terrain, and many parts of this area boast magnificent views of the city, mountains and Okanagan Lake. As a result, this part of town is widely regarded as luxurious and is indeed one of the most expensive neighbourhoods of Kelowna. It is not unusual to see homes worth one million dollars or more, the most expensive of which can reach 5 million or even slightly above.

Rutland 
Rutland is Kelowna's largest neighbourhood by far. Although the majority of the area sits on the valley bottom and is therefore relatively flat, the fringes continue up into the hills and are therefore built at higher elevations and possess more expansive views than the rest of the neighbourhood; these homes are correspondingly more expensive. This is the exception, however, as the majority of Rutland is among the most affordable of Kelowna housing. There are also several low-rise apartment buildings which increase the population density relative to most other parts of town. Rutland was a town until it amalgamated with Kelowna in 1973, and this union has resulted in Rutland having a distinct commercial centre with many shops and restaurants. An improvement and gentrification effort has been ongoing for the past decade, with new parks, widened sidewalks, bike lanes, a renovated YMCA, a rebuilt high school, many new shops and condominiums are being added.

Economy 

The service industry employs the most people in Kelowna, the largest city in the tourist-oriented Okanagan Valley. In summer, boating, golf, hiking and biking are popular, and in winter, both skiing and snowboarding are favourite activities at the nearby Big White and Silver Star ski resorts. Tourism in the Greater Kelowna Area has now become a $1-billion a year industry, as of 2016.

Kelowna produces wines that have received international recognition. Vineyards are common around and south of the city where the climate is ideal for the many wineries. At least two major wineries were damaged or destroyed (now rebuilt) in 2003 due to the Okanagan Mountain Park Fire. Kelowna is also the home of Sun-Rype, a popular manufacturer of fruit bars and juices.

Okanagan College and University of British Columbia are the predominant centres for post-secondary education. Over 8,745 students attend Okanagan College and 8,718 students attend the University of British Columbia. In addition to vocational training and adult basic education, the college offers a highly regarded university transfer program. University of British Columbia's Okanagan campus has a student population of over 8,000 full-time students enrolled in diverse undergraduate and graduate programs.

Kelowna is the seat of the Regional District of the Central Okanagan, the third-largest metropolitan area in British Columbia after Vancouver and Victoria and the largest in the British Columbia Interior. With scenic lake vistas and a dry, mild climate, Kelowna has become one of the fastest-growing cities in North America. The appropriate management of such rapid development (and its attendant consequences) is a source of significant debate within the community. Kelowna is the fourth least affordable housing market in Canada, currently maintaining the classification of "Severely Unaffordable". Because of the Okanagan's climate and vineyard-filled scenery, it is often compared to Napa Valley, California.

Kelowna's use as a film locale
 Fido, a comedy/horror/thriller movie about zombies, was filmed in Kelowna and debuted on 7 September 2006 at the Toronto International Film Festival.
 Part of the movie Mee Shee: The Water Giant was filmed in Kelowna.
 The movies Shred and Shred 2 were partially filmed at Big White, a ski hill near Kelowna.
 Flicka: Country Pride, released in 2012, was filmed in Kelowna at several locations, such as Mission Creek Ranch, Kelowna Secondary School, and Gemstone Equestrian Centre.

Kelowna's use as a market trial location
Due to its moderate population, Kelowna is often used as a market trial area where national businesses and organizations can test a new product. Examples include:
 The Canadian Air Transport Security Authority piloted new whole body imaging technology for passenger screening at the Kelowna International Airport from 2008 to 2009.
 Telus Mobility re-launched its Clearnet discount mobile phone brand in Kelowna and Red Deer, Alberta, in 2011.
 Kelowna was the first city in Canada to have a permanent flow-rider, located at the H2O indoor water park.
Peachwave opened its first Canadian store in Kelowna in 2013.
Overwaitea Food Group opened its first Urban Fare location outside of downtown Vancouver in Kelowna.

Demographics 

In 2011, 48.4% of residents were male and 51.6% were female. The predominant language spoken in Kelowna is English.

Children under five accounted for approximately 4.8% of the resident population of Kelowna. This compares with 5.2% in British Columbia, and 5.6% for Canada overall. In mid-2001, 18.4% of the resident population in Kelowna were of retirement age (65 and over for males and females) compared with 13.2% in Canada; the average age is 41.1 years of age, compared to an average age of 37.6 years in Canada.

As per the 2021 census, visible minorities make up about 14% of the population of Kelowna. The largest group of visible minorities are, in order of size, South Asian (4.4%), Chinese (1.9%), Filipino (1.7%), Black (1.3%), Latin American (0.9%) Japanese (0.9%), Southeast Asian (0.7%), Korean (0.5%), West Asian (0.5%), and Arab (0.4%).

Kelowna's population growth has been driven primarily by the movement of Canadians from BC and other provinces into this region, not by international immigration. Only 15.1% of the population is foreign born. On 10 February 2016, Statistics Canada declared the 3.1% Kelowna census metropolitan area growth rate as being the highest in Canada.

Religious groups 
According to the 2021 census, religious groups in Kelowna included:
Irreligion (76,215 persons or 53.8%)
Christianity (56,270 persons or 39.7%)
Sikhism (3,665 persons or 2.6%)
Islam (1,560 persons or 1.1%)
Hinduism (1,090 persons or 0.8%)
Buddhism (895 persons or 0.6%)
Judaism (530 persons or 0.4%)
Indigenous spirituality (95 persons or 0.1%)

Ethnic groups 

Note: Totals greater than 100% due to multiple origin responses.

Chinese population
Kelowna had a historic Chinatown in the area between Harvey Avenue and Leon Avenue, east of Abbott and west of Highway 97 / Harvey Avenue. Historically most residents of this Chinatown were males. In 1909, 15% of Kelowna's population was ethnic Chinese. In 1911, the percentage was the same. That year, Sun Yat-sen visited Kelowna for fundraising purposes. In 1978, the final remaining traditional Chinese business ceased operations. By 2010, less than 1% of Kelowna's population was ethnic Chinese. A section of the façade of the rebuilt "Chinese Store" that was in Chinatown is now housed at the Kelowna Museum.

Homelessness
Women make up nearly half of Kelowna's homeless. In other Canadian cities, the overwhelming majority of homeless are males.

On 12 May 2003, the Kelowna Homelessness Networking Group conducted a limited census, and enumerated 198 people: 54 individuals from the street and 144 individuals in shelters.

On 24 February 2016, as part of the Government of Canada's Homelessness Partnering Strategy, the Central Okanagan Foundation conducted a coordinated Point-in-Time (PiT) Count of Kelowna's homeless population. The survey found at least 233 people were homeless, and another 273 were living in temporary housing.

Transportation 
Kelowna faces severe suburbanization and urban sprawl promoted by the popularity of low-density car-oriented developments. As of 2007, Kelowna has the highest car dependency rate in Canada and has the second highest per-capita road transportation carbon footprint in British Columbia. Despite having a metro population of about 230,000, the greater Kelowna area is slightly bigger than that of Metro Vancouver. Road transportation accounts for more than 65% of total greenhouse gas emission in the city.

Roads and highways 
The city is served by Highway 97 and Highway 33.

Public transport 

Kelowna Regional Transit System is operated by FirstGroup, providing public bus transportation services in Kelowna and its vicinity. Funding for the transit system is shared between the City of Kelowna, Central Okanagan Regional District, District of Lake Country and BC Transit.

Air travel 

Kelowna International Airport (IATA: YLW), north of the city core, is one of the busiest airports in Canada. There are regular flights to and from Calgary, Edmonton, Toronto, Vancouver, Victoria, Cranbrook, Whitehorse, and Seattle, as well as seasonal service to Las Vegas, Phoenix, Montréal, Cuba and Mexico. Three major passenger airlines serve the airport; Air Canada, Alaska Airlines, and WestJet. The airport is also the main hub of cargo airline KF Cargo.

Local services 
Emergency services are provided by the Kelowna General Hospital, the British Columbia Ambulance Service, Kelowna Fire Department, Central Okanagan Search and Rescue and the Royal Canadian Mounted Police.

Venues and attractions 

 Prospera Place, a 6,800-seat indoor arena
 Apple Bowl, a 2,314-seat outdoor stadium
 Elks Stadium, a 1,250-seat outdoor baseball stadium
 Kelowna Art Gallery
Center of Gravity Festival in City Park
 Kettle Valley Railway (Myra Canyon Trestles)
 Big White Ski Resort
 Okanagan Wineries

Culture and sport 

 Westbank First Nation
 Kelowna Rockets – Major Junior hockey team in the Western Hockey League (Winners of the 2004 Memorial Cup)
 Kelowna Chiefs – Junior B hockey team in the KIJHL
 Okanagan Independent Film Festival
 Okanagan Sun – Canadian Junior Football League (Winners of the 1988 and 2000 Canadian Bowl)
 Okanagan Challenge – Pacific Coast Soccer League
 Kelowna Falcons – West Coast Collegiate Baseball League
 Center of Gravity Festival
 Kelowna Hydrofest- American Boat Racing Association (Largest professional boat racing series in Canada)
 Okanagan All Stars Hockey Club
 World Community Film Festival

Education

Post-secondary
 University of British Columbia, Okanagan Campus
 Okanagan College
 Focus College
 Justice Institute of British Columbia (Okanagan Campus)
 Sprott Shaw College (privately owned)
 The Centre for Arts and Technology (privately owned)
 VanWest College (privately owned)

Primary and secondary schools 
Public schools in the Kelowna area are part of School District 23 Central Okanagan. (For a list of primary and middle schools, see the School District 23 Central Okanagan article)
 Secondary (grades 10–12 or 8–12):
 Kelowna Secondary School (offers French immersion)
 Rutland Senior Secondary School
 Mount Boucherie Senior Secondary School
 Okanagan Mission Secondary School
 George Elliot Secondary School
 Central School − Central Programs & Services: Alternative High School

The Conseil scolaire francophone de la Colombie-Britannique operates one Francophone school: école de l'Anse-au-sable primary and secondary school.

Private schools 
 Aberdeen Hall Preparatory School Preparatory School (pre-school, K−12)
 Kelowna Christian School (Pre-12)
 Heritage Christian School (K−12)
 Studio 9 School of The Arts (preschool−11)
 Okanagan Adventist Academy (pre−12)
 Immaculata Regional High School (8–12)
 St. Joseph Elementary (K−7)
 Kelowna Waldorf School (pre−8)
 Okanagan Montessori School (preschool and kindergarten)
 Okanagan Montessori, preschool − grade 6, after school care
 Willowstone Academy (pre-school, K–9)

Public libraries 
 The Okanagan Regional Library has three branches in Kelowna
 Kelowna Branch (Downtown)
 Rutland Branch
 Mission Branch

Crime 
In February 2009, an RCMP gang task unit was approved to help deal with gang violence.

Most crime in Kelowna is non-violent property crime. In 2012, Kelowna had the highest reported crime rate in Canada: 8,875 per 100,000. Police focused on crime in 2014, and Kelowna moved into the number four position across the country.

In 2015, RCMP Supt. Nick Romanchuk stated, "I am absolutely convinced that as our drug enforcement numbers increase, our overall crime rate will decrease." As of 2016, the crime rate had returned to second highest in Canada. In 2017, the property crime in Kelowna rate went up six per cent, once again the highest rate in Canada, while the drug crime rate fell two per cent.

In 2013, 446 victims of domestic violence were reported in Kelowna, earning the city the highest per-capita rate of domestic violence in British Columbia and the tenth-highest across Canada. This was a slight drop compared to 2011, when Kelowna reported the fourth-highest rate nationally and led the province in family violence.

In 2014, Kelowna, there were 251 marijuana charges per 100,000 population, the highest per capita rate in Canada.

In 2012, Kelowna had the highest crime rate of any metropolitan area in Canada, mainly because of its property crime. This increase has, however, been attributed mainly to the actions of a relative few known, prolific offenders. Illicit Drug use is high in the region. Between 2012 and 2016, Kelowna led the country in cannabis, cocaine, and heroin possession. As of 2016, the crime rate has declined to second highest. In 2017, Kelowna had the highest opioid overdose rate in Canada.

Notable people

Politicians
W. A. C. Bennett, late Premier of British Columbia
William R. Bennett, served as Premier of the province

Military
Charles Thomas, Vice Chief of the Defence Staff

Athletes

Steve Bozek, professional ice hockey player
Aleisha Cline, cross skier, Winter X Games medalist
Jason Crumb, professional football player
Mike Crumb, professional football player
Byron Dafoe, professional ice hockey player
Scott Frandsen, Olympic rower
Rob Friend, professional footballer
Josh Gorges, professional ice hockey player
Darren Jensen, professional ice hockey player
Conrad Leinemann, Olympic beach volleyball player
Rory MacDonald, professional Mixed Martial Arts fighter
Heather Mandoli, Olympic rower
Axel Merckx, professional road cyclist
Kees Nierop, professional racecar driver
Taylor Ruck, Olympic swimmer
Justin Schultz, professional ice hockey player
Kelsey Serwa, Gold medal Olympic ski cross athlete
Tyler Shelast, professional ice hockey player
Kierra Smith, Olympic swimmer
Paul Spoljaric, professional baseball player
Ryan Stewart, professional ice hockey player
Christie Van Hees, professional racquetball player, former US Open & World Champion
Danny Watkins, professional football player
Jerod Zaleski, professional football player
Jeff Zimmerman, professional baseball player
Jordan Zimmerman, professional baseball player
Jessica Campbell, professional hockey player and skating coach

Entertainers
Chad Brownlee, country music artist
Conro, DJ and producer
 Datsik, DJ and producer
 Ryan Ellsworth, actor
Excision, DJ and producer
Jillian Harris, television personality
Taylor Hickson, actress, singer-songwriter
Janyse Jaud, actress/singer
Paul Johansson, actor
Taylor Kitsch, actor
Evangeline Lilly, actress/model
Julie Masi, vocalist, songwriter and musician (The Parachute Club)
Lauren Glazier, actress
Twistzz, professional Counter Strike: Global Offensive player for FaZe Clan

Authors 
Fern G. Z. Carr
Melonie Dodaro
Alix Hawley
Naben Ruthnum
Jack Whyte

Sister cities 
Kelowna has "sister city" agreements with the following cities:
 Kasugai, Aichi, Japan

Freedom of the City 
The following People and Military Units have received the Freedom of the City of Kelowna.

Individuals

 Brigadier General Harry Herbert "H.H." Angle : 7 January 1946.
 Barbara Ann Scott : 24 October 1949.
 The Honourable W. A. C. Bennett : 8 December 1952.
 George Howard Dunn: 4 April 1955.
 Stanley Merriam Simpson: 15 April 1957.
 Dr. William John Knox : 3 January 1961.
 Major General The Honourable George Randolph Pearkes : 24 April 1967.
 Richard Francis "Dick" Parkinson: 5 January 1970.
 Dr. Walter Frederick Anderson: 28 September 1981.
 Blair Horn: 11 September 1984.
 The Honourable William Richards "Bill" Bennett : 1 November 1988.
 James H. Stuart: 1 July 2001.
 Benjamin "Ben" Lee: 1 July 2001.
 Senator The Honourable D. Ross Fitzpatrick : 26 May 2008.
 Walter Gray: 25 April 2015.
 Andre Blanleil: 25 April 2015.
 Robert Hobson: 25 April 2015.

Military Units
 The British Columbia Dragoons: 11 February 1963.

See also 

 Orchard Park Shopping Centre
 Sunshine tax
 The Daily Courier
 WT Small House
 Tallest buildings in Kelowna

References

Notes

External links

 
1879 establishments in British Columbia
Cities in British Columbia
Populated places established in 1879
Populated places on Okanagan Lake